Jack Tidball was an American tennis player.

Active in the 1930s, Tidball was a leading player in collegiate tennis for the UCLA Bruins. He was the 1933 national intercollegiate champion, which made him the first Bruin to win the title. His 1933 season also included a win over Ellsworth Vines at the Pacific Southwest Championships and a U.S. Clay Court doubles championship. He won further singles titles at the Southern California Championships in 1934 and the Canadian Championships in 1936.

Tidball's two sons were college tennis players as well. His youngest son Steve competed for UCLA, while elder son John was a USC player. Both featured at tour level.

References

External links
 

Year of birth missing
2000 deaths
American male tennis players
UCLA Bruins men's tennis players